Bapira (also Romanized as Bāpīrā) is a village in Abezhdan Rural District, Abezhdan District, Andika County, Khuzestan Province, Iran. At the 2006 census, its population was 107, in 22 families.

References 

Populated places in Andika County